Tremaine the Album (or simplified as Tremaine) is the seventh studio album by American singer and songwriter Trey Songz. It was released on March 24, 2017, by Troy Taylor's Songbook label, under the distribution from Atlantic Records. The album follow suit to Songz' sixth studio album, Trigga (2014).

Musically it's an R&B album about the toughness of changing a playboy lifestyle to a romantic one. The album was supported by five singles: "Nobody Else but You", "Playboy", "Animal", "Song Goes Off", and "The Sheets... Still". The album peaked at number three on the Billboard 200, and was certified gold by the Recording Industry Association of America (RIAA) for combined sales and album-equivalent units of over 500,000 units in the United States. Tremaine was met with generally positive reviews from contemporary music critics.

Background 
Trey Songz said, during an interview with iHeartRadio, that with the album he wanted to be more vulnerable to his audience, also giving a sound that "is more genuinely what R&B means to [him] and what it has meant to [his] career", compared to the club-R&B sound of its "brash [and] bravado" predecessor Trigga. When asked about Tremaine lyrical theme he said:

Music and lyrics 

Tremaine is an R&B album, with a consistent mid-tempo groove, about the toughness of changing a playboy lifestyle to a romantic one, showing vulnerable moments where he desires to prove himself to his loved one, as well as introspections about how he personally feels unsatisfied not expressing his genuine love for another because of his Casanova image, also having "hyper-libidinous" tracks where he celebrates the beautiness of sexual temptation.

The album opens up with the lines "I been stressed out / I ain't feeling my best / All they want is my sex", setting the theme for the album. On the "90's inspired" slow-jam "Playboy", he laments his inability to change, singing "Don't know why I'm still kissing girls that I don't love / still stumbling out of these clubs / still I'm just so hard to trust / don't know why I'm still a playboy". On tracks like "Nobody Else but You", "Come Over" and "Priceless" he approaches his loved one as a changed man, stating that all he wants and needs is her love. On "Animal" and "She Lovin It" he finds himself really enjoying himself during wild one-night stands. The album also contains painful breakup songs, suggesting the in and out situation with his former girlfriend caused by his way of living his sexuality, including the alternative R&B record "Song Goes Off", and the album's final track "Break from Love", a piano ballad where he yearns "I don't want to break from us / After all we've been through so much / I don't want to break from love".

Critical reception

Upon its release, the album received generally positive reviews from contemporary music critics. Andy Kellman of AllMusic praised its vocal performance stating "as vocalist of such considerable caliber [...] [t]here's no disproving that Songz is still in his element" but found its production to be "too flat and usual at times". Revolt's Maurita Salkey was complimentary of the album, saying "Trey's three-year hiatus seems to have paid off. This album leaves you with an array of emotions, but most importantly leaves you yearning for more." John Kennedy of Vibe praised its lyrical content, stating that it shows "a softer side of the guy who invented sex", ending up his review by saying that "Trigga and Tremaine [are] pop culture's great dualities [that distinct] the two sides of Trey Songz". Maeve McDermott of USA Today commended the "better man" promise songs like "Nobody Else but You", "Playboy" and "Priceless", but was dismissive of the lyrical production on songs like "1x1" and "#1 Fan", affirming "he's trying too hard to prove his changing to still betray hints of his toxic masculinity along the way". Kyle Mullin of Exclaim! said that "If only Songz had filled out Tremaine the Album with such stronger fare, it would be an LP worthy of bearing his name."

Commercial performance
Tremaine debuted at number three on the US Billboard 200 behind Drake's More Life and Ed Sheeran's ÷ with 67,000 album-equivalent units, which included 45,000 pure album sales in its first week. It serves as Trey Songz's fifth consecutive top three album in the United States. On September 17, 2019, The album was certified gold by the Recording Industry Association of America for combined sales and album-equivalent units of over 500,000 units in the United States.

Track listing
Credits adapted from Tidal.

Notes
  signifies a co-producer
  signifies an additional producer

Charts

Weekly charts

Year-end charts

Certifications

References 

2017 albums
Albums produced by Poo Bear
Trey Songz albums
Albums produced by Troy Taylor (record producer)